A Whole Lot More to Me is the seventh studio album by American country music artist Craig Morgan. It was released on June 3, 2016 via Black River Entertainment. It includes the singles "When I'm Gone" and "I'll Be Home Soon".

Reception

The album debuted at No. 16 on the Top Country Albums chart, with 3,500 copies sold in the first week. The album has sold 7,100 copies in the United States as of July 2016.

Track listing

Personnel
 Greg Barnhill – background vocals
 Shannon Forrest – drums, percussion
 Larry Franklin – fiddle, mandolin
 Paul Franklin – steel guitar
 Byron Gallimore – electric guitar, keyboards, synthesizer strings
 Tania Hancheroff – background vocals
 Wes Hightower – background vocals
 David LaBruyere – bass guitar
 Troy Lancaster – electric guitar
 Will Hoge - harmonica
 Tony Lucido – bass guitar
 Craig Morgan – lead vocals
 Steve Nathan – keyboards
 Mac Powell – duet vocals on "Hearts I Leave Behind"
 Angela Primm – background vocals
 Danny Rader – banjo, bouzouki, acoustic guitar
 Ilya Toshinsky – acoustic guitar

Chart performance

Albums

Singles

References

2016 albums
Craig Morgan albums
Black River Entertainment albums
Albums produced by Byron Gallimore